Frank Edwin Mitchinson (3 September 1884 – 27 March 1978) was a New Zealand rugby union player. A three-quarter, Mitchinson represented Wellington and Wanganui at a provincial level, and was a member of the New Zealand national side, the All Blacks, from 1907 to 1913. He played 31 matches for the All Blacks including 11 internationals, captaining the side in four matches in 1913.

Following the death of Peter Williams in 1976, Mitchinson was the oldest living All Black.

References

1884 births
1978 deaths
People from Lawrence, New Zealand
New Zealand rugby union players
New Zealand international rugby union players
Wellington rugby union players
Wanganui rugby union players
Rugby union three-quarters
Rugby union players from Otago